Jacob Kielland may refer to:

Jacob Kielland (businessman) (1788–1863), Norwegian businessman, consul and politician
Jacob Kielland (officer) (1825–1889), naval officer and politician, son of Jacob Kielland (1788–1863)
Jacob Kielland (priest) (1841–1904), priest and politician, nephew of Jacob Kielland (1825–1889)
Jacob Christie Kielland (1897–1972), architect, grandson of Jacob Kielland (1841–1915)